The Church of St Michael and St Mary Magdalene, is the Parish Church of Easthampstead, Berkshire. The parish of Easthampstead is one of the largest parishes in the Church of England. The ethos of the parish is one of traditional worship allied to a liberal theology and inclusive approach to both social issues and theology. The church supports a large and growing congregation with activities and study groups for all ages.

History
God has been worshipped on the site of the church for well over 1000 years. By tradition, St Birinus, the first Christian missionary to the area, baptised in the spring just west of the present Church. According to legend, it was here that Cynegils, king of the West Saxons, first accepted Christianity in AD 635. Its prominent  position on a hill, coupled with the dedication to St. Michael, one of the four archangels, and destroyer of the Devil, suggests that it might have been a place of pre-Christian worship.

The church was originally at the centre of a small ancient village, situated at the western gate to Windsor Forest, but is now part of the new town of Bracknell.

The present Parish Church was largely rebuilt in 1867, but retains many items from across the centuries. Rev. Osborne Gordon, Rector of Easthampstead from 1860, organised the rebuilding of the Church as well as the enlarging of the parish schools. The work was paid for by Caroline, Marchioness of Downshire, who lived at nearby Easthampstead Park.

There are nineteenth-century stained glass windows by William Morris and four windows by Sir Edward Burne-Jones, including the great east window featuring the building's patron saint at the Last Judgment (from the Book of Daniel). This is probably the artist's best work in glass to be seen anywhere.

On 9 June 2013, a new stained glass window in the porch, by the artist Thomas Denny, was unveiled by John Nike OBE DL. The window depicts Cynegils King of Wessex's baptism, witnessed by King Oswald of Northumbria and two of the daughters of Cynegils. The baptism established Christianity in the Thames Valley and may have taken place at Easthampstead in 635. The window marks the 60th anniversary of the coronation of Queen Elizabeth II.

There are memorials to the Trumbull and Downshire families, to the poet, Elijah Fenton, and to the polar explorer Frederick George Jackson.

In January 2009, major repair works to the roof were started, to deal with problems of dry rot, and damage from Death-watch beetle larvae. During this time, the congregation moved to the Roman Catholic church of St Margaret Clitherow in Bracknell.

Churchyard and wildlife
In recognition of the wildlife interest, the churchyard was entered into the Living Churchyards and Cemeteries Project in 2002 and received an Award in 2004. Work undertaken as part of the entry into the project has included monitoring wildlife, erecting bat and bird boxes and planting wildflowers.

Despite its busy urban setting, the churchyard is a haven for wildlife. Over a hundred plant species are found here, including many traditionally found in churchyards, for example germander speedwell (Angel's eyes), snowdrops (Eve's tears) and greater stitchwort (Easter bell).

The tombstones support lichens and mosses. Insects use the crevices present in many of the stones for shelter, and the stag beetle, an increasingly threatened insect which is listed on the Borough's Biodiversity Action Plan, has been spotted here.

The oldest living organism in the churchyard is a veteran yew tree near the south gate. Its girth exceeds 13 feet and in February its male cones release drifts of pollen into the wind.

Phone mast
During the early 2000s, phone companies applied to erect a phone mast in the Easthampstead area. After surveying was carried out, a report concluded that there was no suitable land on which to build a normal mast. Opposition to the visual impact came from local residents, who also cited health concerns over its proximity to a local school. The mast was erected but not in the conventional sense: the antennae have been placed on the four faces of the bell tower, and have been disguised to look like architecture.

References

External links

Church of England church buildings in Berkshire
Bracknell
Easthampstead, St Michael
Churches completed in 1867
Rebuilt churches in the United Kingdom